

Bursaphelenchus is a genus of nematodes (roundworms) in the order Aphelenchida. Most are obligate mycophages, but some feed on wood, with two species, the red ring nematode (B. cocophilus) and the pine wood nematode (B. xylophilus), economically significant as pests of coconut palms and of pine trees, respectively. Given that Bursaphelenchus species are usually hard to distinguish from one another except by trained nematologists with access to microscopes or DNA sequence analysis, the entire genus is put under quarantine in some countries. Where this is not the case however, these nematodes are becoming established as model organisms for nematode developmental biology, ecology and genetics.

As of 2009, there are about 70 to 90 species in the genus. New taxa are described frequently.

Ecology
Bursaphelenchus contains a single described hermaphroditic species, okinawaensis, and over 100 described gonochoristic species. They inhabit soil or decaying wood, feeding on the wood itself or fungal hyphae growing in it, such as those of grey mould (Botrytis cinerea). They are sometimes beneficial when they reduce the fungal load inside the wood, but when they consume the plant tissue they are known to cause the death of living trees.

These nematodes are phoretic, dispersed between trees when their dauer larvae are transported by insects. Species involved include bark beetles, weevils, flat-faced longhorn beetles such as sawyer beetles, and soil-nesting bees. The process of dauer larva formation is not well understood, but it is of research interest because it is significant in the epidemics of plant diseases caused by these nematodes, such as pine wilt.

Selected species
Bursaphelenchus includes:

 Bursaphelenchus abietinus Braasch & Schmutzenhofer, 2000
 Bursaphelenchus abruptus
 Bursaphelenchus africanus Braasch, et al., 2007
 Bursaphelenchus anatolius
 Bursaphelenchus antoniae
 Bursaphelenchus arthuri
 Bursaphelenchus borealis
 Bursaphelenchus chitwoodi
 Bursaphelenchus clavicauda
 Bursaphelenchus cocophilus – red ring nematode
 Bursaphelenchus conicaudatus
 Bursaphelenchus doui
 Bursaphelenchus eggersi
 Bursaphelenchus eremus
 Bursaphelenchus fraudulentus
 Bursaphelenchus fungivorus Franklin & Hooper, 1962
 Bursaphelenchus gerberae
 Bursaphelenchus hellenicus Skarmoutsos, Braasch & Michalopoulou, 1998
 Bursaphelenchus hildegardae
 Bursaphelenchus hofmanni Braasch, 1998
 Bursaphelenchus hunti
 Bursaphelenchus hylobianum
 Bursaphelenchus kevini
 Bursaphelenchus mucronatus
 Bursaphelenchus okinawaensis Kanzaki, et al., 2008
 Bursaphelenchus paracorneolus
 Bursaphelenchus parvispicularis
 Bursaphelenchus pinasteri
 Bursaphelenchus piniperdae Fuchs, 1937
 Bursaphelenchus platzeri
 Bursaphelenchus poligraphi
 Bursaphelenchus rainulfi
 Bursaphelenchus sachsi
 Bursaphelenchus seani Giblin & Kaya, 1983
 Bursaphelenchus sexdentati Rühm, 1960
 Bursaphelenchus sinensis
 Bursaphelenchus singaporensis
 Bursaphelenchus thailandae
 Bursaphelenchus tusciae
 Bursaphelenchus vallesianus
 Bursaphelenchus xylophilus – pine wood nematode, pine wilt nematode
 Bursaphelenchus yongensis

References 

Aphelenchida